Painted in Exile is an American progressive metal band from Long Island, New York with mathcore, technical death metal, metalcore, jazz, and hip hop elements.

Discography

Studio albums
The Ordeal (2016)

Singles
 DM (2014)

EPs
 Revitalized (2009)
 3.14 demo (2008)

Videography 
"House of Cards" (2016)
"Revitalized" (2010)

Band members
Current
 Eddie DeCesare — Drums & Percussion (2007–Present) (Monochromatic Black)
 Marc Lambert — Guitar (2008–Present)
 Ivan Chopik - Guitar (2011–Present) 
 Jacob Umansky - Bass (2014–Present)
 Robert Richards — Vocals (2007-2014) (2015–Present)

Former
 Alan Hankers - Piano & Keyboards (2012-2017)
 Connor Larkin — Bass (2010)
 Vincent Romanelli - Bass (2008-2010)
 James Murphy — Guitar (2007-2010)
 William Murphy - Keyboard (2007-2010)
 Zak Avanzato - Bass (2007-2008)
 Marcus Becker - Guitar (2007-2008)

Timeline

References

External links
 Official MySpace page
 Official Bandcamp page
 Official YouTube page
 Official Facebook page

American progressive metal musical groups